Nœux-les-Mines is a commune in the Pas-de-Calais department in the Hauts-de-France region of France.

Geography
As the name of the town itself might imply, it was established as a coal mining centre, however with the decline of the mining industry in the area Nœux-les-Mines has evolved to become a light industrial and farming town.

History
Nœux-les-Mines was first recorded in the 4th century as Vitri. It was destroyed in 882 by the Normans, before being rebuilt in the 10th century, when it became known as Noewe.

It was part of the small province of Gohelle, itself part of the province of Artois, and was mainly an agricultural town with associated small activities incidental to farming, such as flour mills, sugar mills and breweries.

The name was transformed from Noewe to Nœux-lez-Béthune over the years, but became Nœux-les-Mines in 1887, a few years after the discovery of coal deposits in 1850, when the population numbered a mere 1100 inhabitants. From the opening of the first pit in 1851 the town experienced a strong surge in population up until 1962. All the pits were closed down between 1956 and 1968.

In 1996, the commune transformed one of its old mine ramps into an artificial ski slope, which operates throughout the year. Within this same sports complex (Loisinord) is a boating lake.

Population

Places of interest
 The church of St. Martin, dating from the nineteenth century.
 The Commonwealth War Graves Commission cemetery.
 The coal mining museum.
 A modern church dedicated to St. Barbe.
 An eighteenth-century farmhouse.
 An oil-pressing mill.

Notable people
 Footballer Raymond Kopa, star of Real Madrid and the France national team that reached the 1958 World Cup Finals in Sweden.

Twin towns
  La Clusaz, Haute-Savoie, in the French Alps.

See also
 Communes of the Pas-de-Calais department

References

External links

 The CWGC graves in the churchyard
 The CWGC cemetery

Noeuxlesmines